James Stanley Freeman (May 12, 1874 in Jasper, Alabama – April 26, 1960 in Jasper, AL), known as "Big Jim", was an Alabama millionaire in the early 20th century and one of the first Americans to amount a fortune through Wall Street investments.  

He was famous for making and losing over a million dollars twice before 1900.  Freeman retired as one of the wealthiest men in the Southern United States.  He and his wife, Willie Lee Shepherd, had one son, James Shepherd Freeman, a World War II admiral.  His grandson was James Shepherd Freeman Jr.

1874 births
1960 deaths
People from Jasper, Alabama
Businesspeople from Alabama